Visner is a surname. Notable people with the surname include:

Joe Visner (1859–1945), American baseball player
Pe'er Visner (born 1957), Israeli politician

See also
Viner
Visser